Imre Farkas (23 June 1935 – 10 August 2020) was a Hungarian sprint canoer who competed in the late 1950s and early 1960s. He was Jewish.  Competing in two Summer Olympics, he won two bronze medals, earning one in 1956 (C-2 10000 m) and one in 1960 (C-2 1000 m).

See also
 List of select Jewish canoers

References

External links
 

1935 births
2020 deaths
Canoeists at the 1956 Summer Olympics
Canoeists at the 1960 Summer Olympics
Hungarian male canoeists
Olympic canoeists of Hungary
Olympic bronze medalists for Hungary
Olympic medalists in canoeing
Jewish Hungarian sportspeople
Medalists at the 1960 Summer Olympics
Medalists at the 1956 Summer Olympics
20th-century Hungarian people